Alberta "Bety" Cariño Trujillo, a Woman Human Rights Defender, was the director of CACTUS (Centro de Apoyo Comunitario Trabajando Unidos), a community organization in Oaxaca, Mexico. On April 27, 2010, she was killed when paramilitaries ambushed a caravan on its way to the indigenous autonomous community of San Juan Copala. The caravan, including local and international human rights observers, was delivering food to the community which has been under a blockade from paramilitaries allied with the state government. The gunmen also killed Jyri Jaakkola, a Finnish human rights activist, and more than ten people were wounded.

Cariño was Mixtec and an advocate for food sovereignty, community water management, soil conservation and the right to autonomy for indigenous peoples in Mexico. As part of her work with CACTUS, she worked to organize women's collectives in northern Oaxaca. She was one of the leaders of CACTUS forced to temporarily flee Oaxaca in December 2006 after government repression in response to the 2006 Oaxaca protests.

References

Year of birth missing
2010 deaths
Mexican human rights activists
Women human rights activists
Mixtec people
People murdered in Mexico
Indigenous Mexican women
21st-century Native Americans